A special election was held in  on October 8, 1810, to have Joseph Allen (F) fill a vacancy left by the resignation of Jabez Upham (F).

Election results

Allen took his seat on December 13, 1810, and left in the new year.

See also
List of special elections to the United States House of Representatives

References

United States House of Representatives 1810 10
Massachusetts 1810 10
Massachusetts 1810 10
1810 10
Massachusetts 10
United States House of Representatives 10